The M-61 is a Finnish gas mask manufactured by Nokia since the 1960s up to the 1980s. It was the standard issue gas mask for the Finnish Defense Forces, but was replaced by the updated M-95 in the 1990s. It is a side loading mask (meaning the filter attaches to the side) It uses 60 millimeter threads, but adapters are available to convert it to 40 millimeter threads. 

These masks are quite common on the surplus market, most filters (marked SUOD 61, suodatin is Finnish for filter) on the market have been checked by the Technical Depot of the Finnish Defence Forces in the 1970s-1980s. The weight in grams of the filter is written on the label as before the Gulf War it was thought that a properly stored filter would still be serviceable, providing the weight of the filter had not changed (which would indicate that the activated carbon had changed, taken up moisture etc.). The filters were manufactured by Kemira in Vaasa (now part of Scott Health & Safety, in turn part of Tyco International).

Models
There have been three slightly different models of M-61s.

M-61 (Version 1)
Similar to the United States M9 gas mask, except for the changed exhalation valve, this licensed copy was the first of the series to be introduced.

M-61 (Version 2)
Minor changes to the exhalation valve.

M-61 (Version 3)
Hard plastic, integrated exhalation valve and speech diaphragm. This model has been incorrectly described as a squad leader or NCO model, whereas it is simply the final version and would have been issued to all troops, stocks permitting, in case of mobilization.

References
No Future Productions. "FINLAND." Le Masque à Gaz. No Future Productions, 2007. Web. 10 March 2010. http://www.gasmasks.net/database/finland/finland.htm

Gas masks
Military equipment of Finland